Monclassico is a comune (municipality) in Trentino in the northern Italian region Trentino-Alto Adige/Südtirol, located about  northwest of Trento.

The municipality of Monclassico contains the frazione (subdivision) Presson.

Monclassico borders the following municipalities: Malè, Cles, Croviana and Dimaro.

Demographic evolution

References

External links 

Cities and towns in Trentino-Alto Adige/Südtirol